The Night People is a science fiction novel by author Francis Flagg.  It was published in 1947 by Fantasy Publishing Company, Inc. (FPCI) in an edition of 500 copies.  It is the first book published under the FPCI imprint.

Plot introduction
The novel concerns J. Smith who breaks out of prison by means of time travel.

References

1947 American novels
American science fiction novels
Novels about time travel
Fantasy Publishing Company, Inc. books